The Tikiġaġmiut, an Iñupiat people, live two hundred miles north of the Arctic Circle,  southwest of Utqiagvik, Alaska, in the village of Point Hope. The Tikigaq are the oldest continuously settled Native American site on the continent. They are native whale hunters with centuries of experience co-existing with the Chukchi Sea that surrounds the Point Hope cape on three sides. "Tikiġaq" means "resembles an index finger (point of land)" in the Iñupiaq language.

History
About 1,500 years ago, when Tikiġaġmiut first settled the Point Hope area, they did not depend on whale hunting. Instead, early Tikiġaġmiut were notable for producing elaborate and beautiful art in an artstyle called Ipiutak, after the place where archaeologists first found the artwork. But the Tikagaq's past is a present-day mystery with no explanation for where the ideas for the art came from, nor how a large population was sustained during their earliest centuries without whale dependence.

The Tikigaq relied on berries and roots for food, local willows for house frames, and moss or grass for lamp wicks and insulation.

Today, distribution and movement of game, especially the beluga, bowhead whale, caribou, seal, walrus, fur-bearing animals, polar bear and grizzly bear, directly affect the lives of Tikigaq.

Daily life

About one in three Tikiġaġmiut homes lack running water or sewer connections.

Culture

Also known as Tikigaqmuit or Tikigaqmiut, the Tikiġaġmiut people used to live close together for half the year in underground whale-bone, driftwood, and dirt houses that were connected by tunnels. The men's unit was called the qargi. Tikigaqmiut today live in modern houses. Their connections include the spirits of ancestors, the sun, the moon, and animal worship. Tikiġaġmiut sustain myths about their homeland once being a great whale killed by a shaman's harpoon. Their year involves storytelling, rituals, dances, shamanic seances, puppet shows, divinations, spirit guests, encounters with animal souls, and lunar rites, culminating in the spring with the annual whale hunt.

Tikiġaġmiut people have complex kinship and alliance webs.

Education
Tikigaq School, part of the North Slope Borough School District, is the second largest K-12 in Alaska, serving more than 250 children. Notable to the school's curriculum is a three-week whaling class where a small group of students learn specific whaling traditions and skills.

Notes

Further reading

 Short Sketches of Oldest America by John Beach Driggs
 Asatchaq, Jimmie Killigivuk and Tom Lowenstein, The Things That Were Said of Them: Shaman Stories and Oral Histories of the Tikiġaq People. Berkeley: University of California Press, 1992.

External links
 Tikigaq official website
 Tikigaq photo gallery
 Pulu, Tupou L., Ruth Ramoth-Sampson, and Angeline Newlin. "Whaling: A Way of Life." University of Alaska. 2004. Tikiġaġmiut Lifeways

Alaska Native ethnic groups
Inuit groups
Inupiat